The 2017–18 Mount St. Mary's Mountaineers men's basketball team represented Mount St. Mary's University during the 2017–18 NCAA Division I men's basketball season. The Mountaineers, led by sixth-year head coach Jamion Christian, played their home games at Knott Arena in Emmitsburg, Maryland as members of the Northeast Conference. They finished the season 18–14, 12–6 in NEC play to finish in a tie for second place. As the No. 2 seed in the NEC tournament, they were upset in the quarterfinals by Robert Morris.

On May 2, 2018, Jamion Christian left his alma mater to take the head coaching job at Siena. One week later, the school hired former Mountaineer assistant coach Dan Engelstad from Division III Southern Vermont.

Previous season 
The Mountaineers finished the 2016–17 season 20–16, 14–4 in NEC play to win the regular season NEC championship. The Mountaineers defeated Sacred Heart, Robert Morris, and Saint Francis (PA) to win the NEC tournament championship. As a result, the received the conference's automatic bid to the NCAA tournament. As a No. 16 seed in the East region, the defeated New Orleans in the First Four before losing to #1 Villanova in the first round.

Preseason 
In a poll of league coaches at the NEC media day, the Mountaineers were picked to finish in fourth place. Senior guard Junior Robinson was named the preseason All-NEC team.

Roster

Schedule and results

|-
!colspan=11 style=| Exhibition
  
  
|-
!colspan=11 style=| Non-conference regular season

     
|-
!colspan=11 style=| NEC regular season
  

  
|-
!colspan=11 style=| NEC tournament

References

Mount St. Mary's Mountaineers men's basketball seasons
Mount St. Mary's
2017 in sports in Maryland
2018 in sports in Maryland